Women in Entertainment is an American 501c3 nonprofit organization entertainment conference and summit founded in 2015.

History
Women in Entertainment (WIE) is a nonprofit organization that was founded in 2015 by Renee Rossi and Gretchen McCourt in order to focus on the advancement of women in the entertainment industry. They hold events including the annual Women in Entertainment Summit, first held in 2015 in Los Angeles, CA. The first keynote speaker was Geena Davis, who discussed unconscious bias against women as portrayed in family films. Subsequent conference speakers have included SAG-AFTRA President Gabrielle Carteris in 2017;
 Friends executive producer Marta Kauffman in 2018; and Patricia Heaton in 2019. During the annual event, female individuals from the American entertainment industry speak about issues in the industry and report on successes of women in the art form, with panels focusing on various subjects.

In 2018 Women in Entertainment partnered with the Television Academy Foundation to create the Women in Television Summit, a complementary event. They have also partnered with other organizations to highlight women-made content, such as documentary festivals in Santa Monica, California. In 2019, Women in Entertainment and Writers Guild of America West co-presented an event series called In Her Words: Spotlight on Women Writers in Film & TV, featuring screenings of films and live interviews.

References

2015 establishments in California
Entertainment organizations